Margitta Mazzocchi is an American politician serving as a member of the West Virginia House of Delegates from the 24th district. Elected in November 2020, she assumed office on December 1, 2020.

Early life and education 
Mazzocchi was born in Stolberg, Germany. She earned an undergraduate degree in education from the University of Koblenz and Landau.

Career 
Since moving to the United States, Mazzocchi has worked as the office manager and billing officer for Life Solutions Counseling Services. She also managed a photography studio and worked as a teacher at the Recovery Group of Southern West Virginia.

Personal life 
Mazzocchi and her husband, Eugene, have two children. She became a naturalized citizen of the United States in 2017.

References 

Living people
Year of birth missing (living people)
People from Stolberg (Rhineland)
Republican Party members of the West Virginia House of Delegates
Women state legislators in West Virginia
People from Logan, West Virginia
German emigrants to the United States
Naturalized citizens of the United States
21st-century American women politicians
21st-century American politicians